The following are notable people who were either born, raised, or have lived for a significant period of time in the American state of Louisiana.

A

 Mark Abraham (born 1953), state representative for Calcasieu Parish, effective 2016; incoming state senator, 2020; Lake Charles businessman
 Danneel Ackles (born 1979), actress, model, One Life to Live, One Tree Hill, Friends with Benefits, Supernatural
 Bert A. Adams (1916–2003), member of the Louisiana House of Representatives from Vernon Parish (1956–68)
 Bryan Adams (born 1963), member of the Louisiana House of Representatives from Jefferson Parish
 Jamar Adcock (1917–1991), politician and banker
 Joe Adcock (1927–1999), major league baseball player from Coushatta
 Trace Adkins (born 1962), singer-songwriter originally from Sarepta
 Joe W. Aguillard (born 1956), president of Louisiana College (2005–14)
 Kermit Alexander (born 1941), NFL player; president of NFL Players Association (1971–72)
 Robert Alford (born 1988), cornerback for the Atlanta Falcons
 David Allen (born 1945), productivity consultant, author of Getting Things Done
 August Alsina (born 1992), singer
 William Alston (1921–2009), philosopher
 Jacques Amans (1801–1888), neoclassical portrait artist
 Andy Anders (born 1956), state representative from Concordia Parish
 David Andrews (born 1952), actor, Gordon Cresswell on JAG
 Phil Anselmo (born 1968), singer-songwriter, Pantera
 George Arceneaux (1928–1993), judge
 Louis Armstrong (1901–1971), musician and entertainer
 Jeff Arnold (born 1967), politician
 Daniel F. Ashford (1879–1929), politician and planter
 Evelyn Ashford (born 1957), Olympic sprint champion
 Elizabeth Ashley (born 1939), actress, films and television's Evening Shade
 Nnamdi Asomugha (born 1981), cornerback for the Philadelphia Eagles
 James Benjamin Aswell (1869–1931), US Representative and college president
 D. J. Augustin (born 1987), point guard for the Chicago Bulls
 Lisa Aukland (born 1957), professional bodybuilder and powerlifter
 Lonnie O. Aulds (1925–1984), politician
 Ray Authement (1928–2020), longest-serving public university president in the United States; president of the University of Louisiana at Lafayette (1974–2008)
 The Axeman (fl. 1918–1919), serial killer
 Clarence C. "Taddy" Aycock (1915–1987), speaker of the Louisiana House of Representatives (1952–56) and lieutenant governor (1960–72)

B

 J. S. Bacon (1858–1939), former state representative from Webster Parish
 Boosie Badazz (born 1982), rapper
 Larry Bagley (born 1949), state representative for DeSoto Parish
 Richard Baker (born 1948), former U.S. Representative from Louisiana's 6th congressional district
 Scott Baker (born 1981), starting pitcher for the Minnesota Twins
 George Ballas (1925–2011), inventor of the string trimmer
 Fredo Bang (born 1996), rapper
 Larry S. Bankston (born 1951), politician; son of Jesse Bankston
 Edwards Barham (1937–2014), first Republican elected to Louisiana state senate since Reconstruction (1976–80)
 Mack Barham (1924–2006), Judge of the Louisiana Supreme Court
 Danny Barker (1909–1994), singer-songwriter, musician, writer
 Taylor Barras (born 1957), Speaker of the Louisiana House of Representatives, effective January 11, 2016
 Amy Coney Barrett (born 1972), Associate Justice of the Supreme Court
 Regina Barrow (born 1966), state representative for East and West Baton Rouge parishes (since 2005)
 Dave Bartholomew (1918–2019), musician, composer, promoter
 Brandon Bass (born 1985), power forward for the Boston Celtics
 J. D. Batton (1911–1981), sheriff of Webster Parish (1952–64)
 Carl W. Bauer (1933–2013), politician
 Ralph Norman Bauer (1899–1963), politician
 Bryan Batt (born 1963), actor, Sal Romano on Mad Men
 Arnaz Battle (born 1980), wide receiver for the Pittsburgh Steelers
 Hazel Beard (born 1930), mayor of Shreveport (1990–94)
 P. G. T. Beauregard (1818–1893), general, inventor
 Odell Beckham Jr. (born 1992), wide receiver for the New York Giants
 Lottie Beebe (born 1953), politician and educator
 Geoffrey Beene (1927–2004), fashion designer
 Sidney Bechet (1897–1959), musician
 Clyde F. Bel Jr. (c. 1932–2014), businessman and stare representative for Orleans Parish
 Demetress Bell (born 1984), offensive tackle for the Philadelphia Eagles
 V. J. Bella (born 1927), state legislator and fire marshal
 E. J. Bellocq (1873–1949), photographer
 Judah P. Benjamin (1811–1884), U.S. Senator, Confederate cabinet member, lawyer in Great Britain
 Michael Bennett (born 1985), defensive end for the Seattle Seahawks
 Sherman A. Bernard (1925–2012), politician
 Louis Berry (1914–1998), civil rights attorney from Alexandria
 Johnny Berthelot (born 1951), politician
 B.G. (born 1980), rapper, musician
 Joseph A. Biedenharn (1866–1952), entrepreneur, first to bottle Coca-Cola; settled in Monroe in 1913
 Bienville (Jean-Baptiste Le Moyne) (1680–1767), French colonial governor, founder of New Orleans
 Robert Billiot (born 1953), state representative for Jefferson Parish (since 2008)
 Birdman (born 1969), rapper and record executive
 Stuart Bishop (born 1975), member of the Louisiana House of Representatives for Lafayette
 Morton Blackwell (born 1939), Louisiana Republican political activist, since relocated to Virginia
 Brian Blade (born 1970), award-winning, Grammy-nominated, jazz musician, bandleader, conductor
 Newton C. Blanchard (1849–1922), governor of Louisiana (1904–08); U.S. senator (1894–97)
 Terrence Blanchard (born 1962), musician, composer
 Kathleen Blanco (1942–2019), Governor of Louisiana (2004–08)
 Alexander Boarman (1839–1916), politician
 Walter Boasso (born 1960), politician, businessman
 Hale Boggs (1914–1972), U.S. representative for Louisiana's 2nd congressional district
 Lindy Boggs (1916–2013), wife of Hale Boggs and his successor in Congress, Ambassador to the Vatican
 Thomas Hale Boggs Jr. (1940–2014), lawyer and lobbyist, son of Hale and Lindy Boggs
 William Benton Boggs (1854–1922), first mayor of Plain Dealing (1890); state senator for Bossier and Webster parishes (1908–16)
 Brandon Bolden (born 1990), running back for the New England Patriots
 Buddy Bolden (1877–1930), musician, "inventor of jazz"(?)
 Skip Bolen (fl. 1980s–2010s), photographer
 James E. Bolin (1914–2002), former state representative; former district court judge; retired appeal court judge
 George Washington Bolton (1841–1931), state representative and Speaker of the Louisiana House from Alexandria
 George W. Bond (1891–1974), president of Louisiana Tech University (1928–36)
 James Booker (1939–1983), musician
 Curtis Boozman (1898–1979), state representative from Natchitoches Parish
 Calvin Borel (born 1966), jockey, winner of 2007, 2009 and 2010 Kentucky Derby
 Pierre Bossier (1797–1844), first U.S. representative from Louisiana's 4th congressional district (1843–44)
 Savannah Smith Boucher (born 1943), actress
 Sherry Boucher (born 1945), actress
 MacKenzie Bourg (born 1992), singer-songwriter and contestant on American Idol season 15 
 Charles Boustany (born 1956), US Representative
 Denise Boutte (born 1982), model, actress, Meet the Browns
 John Boutté (born 1958), jazz singer
 Shirley D. Bowler (born 1949), state representative
 Jimmy Boyd (fl. 1940s–1950s), state representative for Bossier Parish from 1944 to 1952
 Betsy Vogel Boze (born 1953), University President at Kent State University Stark Campus
 Harley Bozeman (1891–1971), politician, journalist, and historian
 Henry Braden (1944–2013), African-American politician
 Terry Bradshaw (born 1948), Super Bowl champion Pittsburgh Steelers quarterback, Fox television commentator
 Mike Branch (born 1968), politician and commercial pilot
 Tim Brando (born 1956), CBS Sports announcer
 Elward Thomas Brady Jr. (c. 1926–2007), politician
 Thomas "Bud" Brady (1938–2011), politician
 Wellman Braud (1891–1966), musician
 Donna Brazile (born 1959), author, professor, political analyst for the Democratic Party
 Delvin Breaux (born 1989), cornerback for the New Orleans Saints
 John Breaux (born 1944), U.S. Senator
 Phanor Breazeale (1858–1934), U.S. Representative
 Owen Brennan (1910–1954), restaurateur, Brennan's in New Orleans
 Rick Brewer (born 1956), president of Louisiana College in Pineville since 2015
 Reid Brignac (born 1986), shortstop for the Tampa Bay Rays
 Pat Brister (1946–2020), Republican politician
 Poppy Z. Brite (born 1967), writer
 Chris Broadwater (born 1972), politician
 Clifford Cleveland Brooks (1886–1944), politician
 Lawrence Brooks (1909–2022), supercentenarian, World War II U.S. Army veteran 
 Overton Brooks (1897–1961), U.S. Representative, 1937–1961
 Jared Brossett (born 1982), New Orleans politician
 Edwin S. Broussard (1870–1934), U.S. senator, 1921–1933
 Marc Broussard (born 1982), singer-songwriter
 Robert F. Broussard (fl. 1890s–1910s), U.S. representative for Louisiana's 3rd congressional district 1897–1915 and U.S. senator 1915–1918
 Campbell Brown (born 1968), journalist
 Chad M. Brown (born 1970), state representative for Iberville and Assumption parishes, effective January 2016
 Dee Brown (1908–2002), novelist, historian, author of Bury My Heart at Wounded Knee
 Markel Brown (born 1992), basketball player in the Israeli Basketball Premier League
 H. Rap Brown (born 1943), black activist imprisoned in Georgia
 Henry Newton Brown Jr. (born 1941), state appeals court chief judge
 J. Marshall Brown (1924–1995), politician
 Sharon Brown (fl. 1960s), 1961 Miss USA
 Terry R. Brown (fl. 2010s–2020s) state representative from Grant Parish since 2012
 Tom Brown (1888–1958), musician
 Troy E. Brown (born 1971), former member of the Louisiana State Senate from Assumption Parish
 Roy Brun (born 1953), state representative and judge from Caddo Parish
Stanley Brundy (born 1967), basketball player
 George Brunies (1902–1974), musician
 C.L. Bryant (born 1956), African-American Baptist minister and conservative talk show host over KEEL radio in Shreveport 
 Sherri Smith Buffington (born 1966), politician
 George E. Burch (1910–1986), cardiologist and Tulane Medical School professor
 James Lee Burke (born 1936), crime novelist, born in Texas, raised in Louisiana
 Paul Burke (1926–2009), actor: Naked City, Twelve O'Clock High, The Thomas Crown Affair
 James Burton (born 1939), guitarist

C

 George Washington Cable (1844–1925), writer
 Burl Cain (born 1942), warden of the Louisiana State Penitentiary (since 1995)
 Etienne J. Caire (1868–1955), Republican candidate for governor of Louisiana in 1928 against Huey P. Long
 Riemer Calhoun (1909–1994), state senator from DeSoto and Caddo parishes (1944–52)
 Bill Callegari (born 1941), member of the Texas House of Representatives from Harris County; native of Avoyelles Parish
 Jefferson Caffery (1886–1974), US ambassador; cousin of Patrick T. Caffery and Donelson Caffery
 Patrick T. Caffery (1932–2013), US Representative; cousin of Jefferson Caffery and grandson of Donelson Caffery
 Donelson Caffery (1835–1906), US Senator; grandfather of Patrick T. Caffery
 Chris Cagle (born 1968), country music artist
 George A. Caldwell (1892–1966), building contractor; designed twenty-six public buildings in Louisiana
 Jorrick Calvin (born 1987), cornerback for the Philadelphia Eagles
 Foster Campbell (born 1947), politician
 William Derwood Cann Jr. (1919–2010), World War II lieutenant colonel; mayor of Monroe (1978–79)
 Billy Cannon (1937–2018), football player for LSU, Heisman Trophy winner
 Joseph Cao (born 1968), former U.S. representative; lawyer
 Truman Capote (1924–1984), writer, author of In Cold Blood and Breakfast at Tiffany's
 Lindsey Cardinale (born 1985), American Idol finalist, country singer
 Kitty Carlisle (1910–2007), entertainer and television personality; married to playwright Moss Hart
 Thomas G. Carmody (born 1961), state representative
 Edward M. Carmouche (1921–1990), politician
 Liz Carmouche (born 1984), mixed martial arts fighter
 Paul Carr (1934–2006), actor
 Lane Carson (born 1947), first Vietnam War veteran to serve in Louisiana House of Representatives
 Gary Carter Jr. (born 1974), member of the Louisiana House of Representatives from the Algiers neighborhood in New Orleans, effective 2016
 Robby Carter (born 1960), member of the Louisiana House of Representatives for East Feliciana, St. Helena, and Tangipahoa parishes, 1996–2008 and since 2016
 James Carville (born 1944), political consultant and television commentator
 Tommy Casanova (born 1950), football player, ophthalmologist, politician
 Bill Cassidy (born 1957), U.S. representative, physician
 Don Cazayoux (born 1964), politician
 Leonard J. Chabert (c. 1932–1991), politician
 Marty J. Chabert (born c. 1956), politician
 Norby Chabert (born 1976), politician
 Tina Chandler (born 1974), IFBB professional bodybuilder
 Pokey Chatman (born 1969), basketball player, WNBA head coach
 Clifton Chenier (1925–1987), Zydeco musician
 Claire Chennault (1893–1958), aviator, general
 Jimmy Childress (1932–2015), state and national championship high school football coach
 Jay Chevalier (1936–2019), singer
 Monnie T. Cheves (1902–1988), educator and state legislator
 Kate Chopin (1851–1904), author
 Philip Ciaccio (1927–2015), state representative, New Orleans City Council member, state circuit judge from 1982 to 1998
 Ben Claassen III (born 1978), illustrator and comics artist, DIRTFARM
 Morris Claiborne (born 1990), cornerback for the Dallas Cowboys
 William C. C. Claiborne (1775–1817), first US Governor of Louisiana
 Ryan Clark (born 1979), safety for the Pittsburgh Steelers
 Clem S. Clarke (1897–1967), oilman and politician from Shreveport
 Patricia Clarkson (born 1959), Emmy Award-winning and Academy Award-nominated actress
 Sally Clausen (born 1945), university president and commissioner of higher education
 Thomas G. Clausen (1939–2002), last elected Louisiana state superintendent of education
 Michael Clayton (born 1982), wide receiver for the Tampa Bay Buccaneers
 A.C. "Ace" Clemons Jr. (1921–1992), first Republican state senator since Reconstruction; switched parties in 1970
 Bill Cleveland (1902–1974), Crowley real estate developer and member of both houses of Louisiana state legislature (1944–64); defeated for third term in state Senate in 1964 by Edwin Edwards
 Van Cliburn (1934–2013), classical pianist
 George Henry Clinton – politician
 Carl B. Close (1907–1980), politician
 James E. Cofer (born 1949), president of University of Louisiana at Monroe, 2002–2010
 J. Frank Colbert (1882–1949), politician
 Luther F. Cole (1925–2013), state representative and associate justice of the Louisiana Supreme Court
 Hamilton D. Coleman (1845–1926), U.S. representative from Louisiana's 2nd congressional district (1889–1991)
 Vincent Coleman (1901–1971), actor
 La'el Collins (born 1993), offensive tackle for the Dallas Cowboys
 Landon Collins (born 1994), safety for the New York Giants
 Tazzie Colomb (born 1966), IFBB professional female bodybuilder and powerlifter
 Marshall Colt (born 1948), actor
 Amie Comeaux (1976–1997), country singer
 Ward Connerly (born 1939), political activist, businessman, and former University of California Regent
 Harry Connick Jr. (born 1967), musician, entertainer, actor
 Harry Connick Sr. (born 1926), district attorney, singer
 Patrick Connick (born 1961), politician
 John R. Conniff (1874–1957), educator
 Charlie Cook (born 1953), political analyst
 John Cooksey (born 1941), US Representative
 Donnie Copeland (born 1961), Republican member of the Arkansas House of Representatives; Pentecostal pastor in North Little Rock, native of Monroe, Louisiana
 Charles C. Cordill (1845–1916), politician
 Daniel Cormier (born 1979), UFC fighter and Olympic freestyle wrestler
 Lance Cormier (born 1980), relief pitcher for the Tampa Bay Rays
 Jeff Cox (born 1962), judge
 Robert Crais (born 1953), crime novelist
 Clifford Ann Creed (born 1938), pro golfer
 Scott Crichton (born 1954), state district court judge in Shreveport
 Greg Cromer (born 1958), state representative from St. Tammany Parish
 Brenham C. Crothers (1905–1984), politician
 John David Crow (1935–2015), football player and coach, born in Union Parish
 Marvin T. Culpepper (1908–1970), politician
 William A. Culpepper (1916–2015), judge based in Alexandria, son of Robert C. Culpepper
 Charles Milton Cunningham (1877–1936), educator, lawyer, newspaperman, politician
 Milton Joseph Cunningham (1842–1916), state representative and state senator; state attorney general (1884–88 and 1892–1900)
 Cupid (born 1982), R&B singer
 Currensy (born 1981), rapper
 Joseph T. Curry (1895–1961), politician; planter
 Israel "Bo" Curtis (1932–2012), African-American politician from Alexandria
 Jacob Cutrera (born 1988), middle linebacker for the Jacksonville Jaguars

D

 Casey Daigle (born 1981), former MLB pitcher
 Mike Danahay (born 1957), state representative for Calcasieu Parish (since 2008)
 Stormy Daniels (born 1979), porn actress, stripper
 Jay Dardenne (born 1954), former state senator, Louisiana secretary of state, and lieutenant governor (since 2010); candidate for governor (2015)
 George W. D'Artois (1925–1977), Shreveport public safety commissioner (1962–76)
 Buster Davis (born 1985), wide receiver for the San Diego Chargers
 Edwin Adams Davis (1904–1994), historian
 Glen Davis (born 1986), power forward and center for LSU and the Los Angeles Clippers
 Jackson B. Davis (1918–2016), attorney and former state senator
 Jimmie Davis (1899–2000), singer, Governor of Louisiana
 Willie Davis (1934–2020), Hall of Fame defensive end for the Cleveland Browns and Green Bay Packers
 Keyunta Dawson (born 1985), defensive end for the Indianapolis Colts
 Jay Dean (born 1953), mayor of Longview, Texas, 2005–15; incoming Republican member of the Texas House of Representatives, effective 2017; reared in Opelousas 
 Cleveland Dear (1888–1950), politician
 Michael E. DeBakey (1908–2008), pioneering cardiovascular surgeon
 Jefferson J. DeBlanc (1921–2007), World War II fighter pilot and flying ace, recipient of the Medal of Honor
 Edmond Dede (1827–1903), musician, composer
 Ellen DeGeneres (born 1958), comedian, actress, television personality
 Joe Delaney (1958–1983), running back for Northwestern State University and for the Kansas City Chiefs; died saving children from swimming hole
 Jake Delhomme (born 1975), quarterback for University of Louisiana at Lafayette and for Carolina Panthers in Super Bowl XXXVIII
 David Dellucci (born 1973), MLB outfielder, played primarily with the Arizona Diamondbacks
 Numa T. Delouche (1888–1965), state representative from Natchitoches Parish (1944–48)
 George Dement (1922–2014), politician
 Tim Dement (born 1958), amateur boxer who competed at the 1972 Summer Olympics
 James L. Dennis (born 1936), judge of the United States Court of Appeals for the Fifth Circuit; former judge of the Louisiana Supreme Court; former state representative
 Catherine Dent (born 1965), actress, Danni Sofer on The Shield
 Natalie Desselle-Reid (born 1967), actress
 Lurita Doan (born 1958), Administrator of the General Services Administration under President George W. Bush
 James Dobson (born 1936), evangelical Christian author, psychologist, founder of Focus on the Family
 William Joseph "Bill" Dodd (1909–1991), politician
 James R. Domengeaux (1907–1988), U.S. representative; French language cultural activist
 Ronald Dominique (born 1964) serial killer
 Fats Domino (1928–2017), musician
 Caroline Dormon (1888–1971), naturalist, horticulturist, promoter of Kisatchie National Forest
 Glenn Dorsey (born 1985), defensive end for the San Francisco 49ers
 Lorenzo Doss (born 1994), cornerback for the Denver Broncos
 Cat Doucet (1899–1975), sheriff
 Early Doucet (born 1985), wide receiver for the Arizona Cardinals
 Donna Douglas (born 1933–2015), actress, "The Beverly Hillbillies C. H. "Sammy" Downs (1911–1985), member of both houses of the Louisiana legislature from Rapides Parish
 Gil Dozier (1934–2013), Louisiana Commissioner of Agriculture and Forestry (1976–80)
 Dee D. Drell (born 1947), U.S. district judge in Alexandria
 R. Harmon Drew Sr. (1916–1995), city judge, state representative
 Richard Maxwell Drew (1822–1850), judge and state representative
 Clyde Drexler (born 1962), basketball player, University of Houston, NBA and U.S. Olympic team, member of Basketball Hall of Fame
 John Malcolm Duhé Jr. (born 1933), retired state court, U.S. district, and appellate court judge from New Iberia and Lafayette
 Chris Duhon (born 1982), NBA point guard
 David Duke (born 1950), former state representative, former Ku Klux Klansman
 Lance Dunbar (born 1990), running back for the Dallas Cowboys
 Warrick Dunn (born 1975), NFL running back
 Mark Duper (born 1959), Miami Dolphins wide receiver
 Adrian G. Duplantier (1929–2007), U.S. District Judge and former state senator from Orleans Parish
 Jay Duplass (born 1973), film director
 Gilbert L. Dupré (1858–1946), politician from St. Landry Parish
 H. Garland Dupré (1873–1924), politician
 Champion Jack Dupree (–1992), boxer, musician
 Chad Durbin (born 1977), MLB pitcher
 Joey Durel (born 1953), mayor of Lafayette (since 2004)
 Stanwood Duval (born 1942), federal judge in New Orleans
 Wilbur Dyer (1907–1985), member of the Louisiana House of Representatives from Rapides Parish (1974–80)
 W.E. "Bill" Dykes (1925–2015), politician

E
 Richard Eastham (1916–2005), actor
 William C. Edenborn (1848–1926), railroad magnate, steel industrialist, inventor
 Rick Edmonds (born 1956), state representative for East Baton Rouge Parish; Baptist minister
 Mike Edmonson (born 1958), superintendent of the Louisiana State Police (since 2008)
 Edwin Edwards (1927–2021), Governor of Louisiana
 Lavar Edwards (born 1990), defensive end for the Dallas Cowboys
 Ronnie Edwards (c. 1952 – 2016), Baton Rouge politician
 Troy Edwards (born 1977), football player 
 Charles Wheaton Elam (1866–1917), politician
 Joseph Barton Elam Sr. (1821–1885), politician
 Allen J. Ellender (1890–1972), Member of Congress, United States Senator and President Pro Tem of the Senate
 Frank Burton Ellis (1907–1969), politician
 Faye Emerson (1917–1983), actress
 Julie Emerson (born 1988), state representative for Lafayette and St. Landry parishes
 E. D. Estilette (1833–1919), politician from St. Landry Parish
 Albert Estopinal (1845–1919), politician
 James R. Eubank (1914–1952), lawyer and member of the Louisiana House of Representatives for Rapides Parish
 John D. Ewing (1892–1952), newspaper executive

F

 Jamie Fair (born 1946), former state representative
 Reid Falconer (born 1956), state representative for St. Tammany Parish, effective 2016
 Ralph Falsetta (1914–1999), politician from Ascension Parish
 Alan Faneca (born 1976), NFL offensive guard, member of the Pro Football Hall of Fame
 Rick L. Farrar – state representative from Rapides Parish
 Dillon Farrell (born 1990), center for the San Francisco 49ers
 Clarence Faulk (1909–2010), publisher, broadcaster, businessman from Ruston
 Kevin Faulk (born 1976), New England Patriots running back, LSU Hall of Famer
 Marshall Faulk (born 1973), Hall of Fame running back, television commentator
 Trev Faulk (born 1981), St. Louis Rams linebacker
 William C. Feazel (1895–1965), interim U.S. Senator in 1948; former state representative from Ouachita Parish
 Lionel Ferbos (1911–2014), jazz musician from New Orleans
 Jimmy Field (born 1940), Louisiana Public Service Commissioner (1996–2012)
 T. T. Fields (1912–1994), politician
 David Filo (born 1966), co-founder of Yahoo!
 Olaf Fink (1914–1973), educator and state senator for Orleans Parish from 1956 to 1972
 Valerie Fitzenreiter (born 1955), author, unschooling advocate
 Jimmy Fitzmorris (1921–2021), politician, lieutenant governor
 Sean Patrick Flanery (born 1965), actor
 John C. Fleming (born 1952), U.S. representative; medical doctor
 Dan Flores (born 1948), historian of the American West
 D. J. Fluker (born 1991), offensive tackle for the San Diego Chargers
 Jerry Fontenot (born 1966), assistant coach for the Green Bay Packers
 Mary Alice Fontenot (1910–2003), author
 Mike Fontenot (born 1980), second baseman for the San Francisco Giants
 Elizabeth Erny Foote (born 1953), judge
 Cheryl Ford (born 1981), WNBA player
 Faith Ford (born 1964), actress
 Frankie Ford (1939–2015), singer
 C. B. Forgotston (1945–2016), state government watchdog
 Barbara Forrest (born 20th century), philosopher and prominent critic of the intelligent design movement
 Matt Forte (born 1985), running back for the Chicago Bears
 Ezola B. Foster (1938–2018), conservative political activist, writer, and politician
 Mike Foster (1930–2020), Governor of Louisiana
 Murphy J. Foster (1849–1921), Governor of Louisiana
 Pete Fountain (1930–2016), musician
 Mike Francis (born 1946), businessman, Republican former state party chairman
 Tillman Franks (1920–2006), country musician and manager
 Anthony Freeman (1988-2018), Catholic religious and author
 Mannie Fresh (born 1974), record producer, musician
 J. Isaac Friedman (1877–1949), state representative and state senator from Natchitoches Parish
 Leon Friedman (1886–1948), state representative from Natchitoches Parish (1932–40)
 W. C. Friley (1845–1911), educator and Baptist clergyman
 Lawrence T. Fuglaar (1895–1972), state representative from Rapides Parish (1948–52); drowning victim
 Hoffman Franklin Fuller (born 1932), professor emeritus at Tulane University Law School, authority on tax law 
 Samuel B. Fuller (1905–1988), founder and president of the Fuller Products Company, publisher of the New York Age and Pittsburgh Courier Henry L. Fuqua (1865–1926), Governor of Louisiana (1924–26, his death)
 J. B. Fuselier (1901–1975), Cajun musician from Oberlin, Louisiana
 Mike Futrell (born 1960), politician

G

 Ernest Gaines (1933–2019), author
 Randal Gaines (born 1955), African American; lawyer; educator; state representative for St. Charles and St. John the Baptist parishes (since 2012)
 Daniel F. Galouye (1920–1976), science fiction writer
 Count Bernardo de Gálvez (1746–1786), Spanish governor; viceroy of New Spain
 John Sidney Garrett (1921–2005), former Speaker of the Louisiana House of Representatives from Claiborne Parish
 Jim Garrison (1921–1992), former New Orleans district attorney; later a state judge
 Robert T. Garrity Jr. (born 1949), former member of the Louisiana House of Representatives for Jefferson Parish
 Kevin Gates (born 1986), rapper
 Chad Gaudin (born 1983), MLB pitcher
 Randall Gay (born 1982), cornerback for the New Orleans Saints
 Johnny Giavotella (born 1987), second baseman for the Los Angeles Angels
 Philip H. Gilbert (1870–1932), politician; former lieutenant governor
 Mickey Gilley (born 1936), musician; singer; nightclub owner
 David 'Bo' Ginn (1951–2006), state senator or Morehouse Parish (1980–88) 
 George Girard (1930–1957), musician
 Hap Glaudi (1912–1989), New Orleans sports journalist
 Edgar Godbold (1879–1952), president of Louisiana College (1942–51)
 H. N. Goff (1910–1978), state representative from Rapides Parish (1952–56)
 Victor Gold (1928–2017), journalist and political consultant
 John Goodman (born 1952), actor
 Cletis Gordon (born 1982), cornerback for the United Football League's Florida Tuskers
 Stephen Gostkowski (born 1984), placekicker for the New England Patriots
 Louis Moreau Gottschalk (1829–1869), pianist; composer
 Lucille May Grace (1900–1957), first woman in statewide elected office as register of state lands
 Shirley Ann Grau (1929–2020), writer
 Webster "Webbie" Gradney Jr. (born 1985), rapper
 Danny Granger (born 1983), small forward for the Philadelphia 76ers
 Veleka Gray (born 1951), actress; writer; producer
 Todd Graves (born 1972), entrepreneur and founder of Raising Cane's Chicken Fingers 
 Douglas D. "Doug" Green (born c. 1950), politician
 Howard Green (born 1979), nose tackle for the Green Bay Packers
 BenJarvus Green-Ellis (born 1985), running back for the New England Patriots
 Thomas A. "Tom" Greene (born 1948), former state senator
 John Grenier (1930–2007), Republican politician in Alabama; born in New Orleans
 Grits Gresham (1922–2008), sportsman; journalist
 J. D. Grey (1906–1985), clergyman
 Robert Groves (born 1948), sociologist; Director of the United States Census Bureau under U.S. President Barack Obama
 Anthony Guarisco Jr. (born 1938), politician
 Dudley A. Guglielmo (1909–2005), insurance commissioner
 Dick Guidry (1929–2014), politician; businessman from Lafourche Parish
 Greg G. Guidry (born 1960), member of the Louisiana Supreme Court
 Richard Guidry (1949–2008), advocate of French language in Louisiana
 Ron Guidry (born 1950), Cy Young Award-winning pitcher for the New York Yankees
 Brandon Guillory (born 1985), businessman
 Elbert Guillory (born 1944), politician
 G. Earl Guinn (1912–2004), president of Louisiana College (1951–75)
 Bryant Gumbel (born 1948), television journalist
 Greg Gumbel (born 1946), sportscaster
 Buddy Guy (born 1936), blues musician

H

 Billy Hagan (1932–2007), NASCAR owner and racer, businessman
 Richard T. Haik (born 1950), United States District Judge for the Western District of Louisiana
 Ted Haik (born 1945), politician
 Jeff Hall (born 1951), state representative for Rapides Parish (since 2015)
 Pike Hall Jr. (1931–1999), judge from Shreveport
 Rusty Hamer (1947–1990), child actor
 Paul Jude Hardy (born 1942), state senator, secretary of state, lieutenant governor
 Henry E. Hardtner (1870–1935), lumberman, conservationist, politician, founder of Urania
 John Spencer Hardy (1913–2012), lieutenant general in the United States Air Force
 Robert Harling (born 1951), playwright, screenwriter and film director, wrote Steel Magnolias Winsor Harmon (born 1963), actor, The Bold and the Beautiful Lance Harris (born 1961), state representative
 Will Harris (born 1984), relief pitcher for the Houston Astros
 Damon Harrison (born 1988), nose tackle for the New York Giants
 Joe Harrison (born c. 1952), state representative
 Ryan Harrison (born 1992), professional tennis player
 Leonard R. "Pop" Hataway (born 1939), former sheriff of Grant Parish
 Torrence "Lil Boosie" Hatch (born 1982), rapper
 Jason Hatcher (born 1982), defensive end for the Dallas Cowboys
 Kenny Havard (born 1971), politician
 Elvin Hayes (born 1945), Hall of Fame basketball player
 Hunter Hayes (born 1991), country singer
 Rufus D. Hayes (1913–2002), first state insurance commissioner, East Baton Rouge Parish district attorney and judge, Democratic state chairman
 William Wright Heard (1853–1926), governor of Louisiana (1900–04)
 Bobby Hebert (born 1960), New Orleans Saints quarterback known as "Cajun Cannon"
 Felix Edward Hébert (1901–1979), journalist, politician
 Paul M. Hebert (1907–1977), judge, Louisiana State University Law Center dean
 Troy Hebert (born 1966), politician
 Lee Hedges (born 1929), champion football coach in Shreveport
 Talmadge L. Heflin (born 1940), former member of the Texas House of Representatives
 Marie Alice Heine (1858–1925), first American Princess of Monaco
 Betty Heitman (1929–1994), Republican politician
 David Heitmeier (born 1961), state senator for Orleans Parish (since 2008); optometrist
 Francis C. Heitmeier (born 1950), former state senator for Orleans Parish; lawyer and lobbyist
 Knute Heldner (1875–1952), impressionist artist
 Lillian Hellman (1905–1984), playwright and screenwriter
 Devery Henderson (born 1982), wide receiver for the New Orleans Saints
 Lloyd Hendrick (1908–1951), Shreveport lawyer and state senator for DeSoto and Caddo parishes (1940–48)
 Ellis Henican (born 1958), journalist, commentator, talk show host
 Jeff Hennessy – trampoline coach
 Leigh Hennessy – world champion gymnast and movie stuntwoman
 Shelley Hennig (born 1987), actress, Days of Our Lives Charlie Hennigan (1935–2017), football player
 Gilbert Franklin Hennigan (1883–1960), politician
 Cameron Henry (born 1974), politician
 Clarence "Frogman" Henry (born 1937), singer, musician
 Gloria Henry (1923–2021), actress, CBS's Dennis the Menace Bob Hensgens (born 1955), state representative
 George Herriman (1880–1944), Krazy Kat cartoonist
 Louis Herthum (born 1956), actor, Murder, She Wrote Jacob Hester (born 1985), fullback for the San Diego Chargers
 Emma Churchman Hewitt (1850–1921), writer, journalist
 W. W. Hicks (1843–1925), member of the Louisiana House of Representatives for Webster Parish (1900–04)
 Andrew Higgins (1886–1952), shipbuilder, industrialist
 Clay Higgins (born 1961), U.S. representative for Louisiana's 3rd congressional district, beginning 2017
 Stephanie Hilferty (born 1985), state representative for Orleans and Jefferson parishes since 2016 
 Kenny Hill (born 1958), NFL defensive back
 Corey Hilliard (born 1985), offensive tackle for the Detroit Lions
 Quin Hillyer (born 1964), columnist and editor
 Donald E. Hines (1933–2019), politician and physician
 Walker Hines (born 1984), state representative from Orleans Parish
 Al Hirt (1922–1999), musician
 Valarie Hodges (born 1955), politician
 Melvin L. Holden (born 1952), first African-American mayor of Baton Rouge
 Cheryl Holdridge (1944–2009), actor
 Trindon Holliday (born 1986), wide receiver and return specialist for the New York Giants
 Earl Holliman (born 1928), actor
 Harry Hollins (1932–1989), state representative for Calcasieu Parish from 1964 to 1980
 Paul Hollis (born 1972), state representative from St. Tammany Parish
 Clyde C. Holloway (1943–2016), former US Representative; member of the Louisiana Public Service Commission
 Ben F. Holt (1925–1995), politician
 Jay F. Honeycutt (born 1937), former director of the Kennedy Space Center
 Russel L. Honoré (born 1947), general during Hurricane Katrina relief
 Dodie Horton – state representative for Bossier Parish, effective 2016
 Son House (1902–1988), blues singer and guitarist
 TJ House (born 1989), pitcher for the Cleveland Indians
 Alton Hardy Howard (1925–2006), co-founder of Howard Brothers Discount Stores; gospel songwriter
 Jaye Howard (born 1988), nose tackle for the Kansas City Chiefs
 V. E. Howard (1911–2000), Church of Christ clergyman, founder of radio International Gospel Hour W. L. "Jack" Howard (1921–2004), mayor of Monroe and partner of Howard Brothers Discount Stores
 Arlene Howell (born 1939), Miss USA 1958 and actress: Bourbon Street Beat Jerry Huckaby (born 1941), US Representative
 Jefferson D. Hughes III (born 1952), associate justice of the Louisiana Supreme Court since 2013
 William Clark Hughes (1868–1930), Speaker of the Louisiana House of Representatives (1926–28); Bossier Parish farmer
 Melvin Hunt (born 1969), assistant coach of the Dallas Mavericks
 Clementine Hunter (c. 1886–1988), folk artist
 Jeffrey Hunter (1926–1969) actor – The Searchers, King of Kings; born in New Orleans; reared in Wisconsin
 Marcus Hunter (born 1979), politician
 Carolyn Huntoon (born 1940), scientist
 Mike "Pete" Huval (born c. 1956), politician

I
 Pierre Le Moyne, Sieur d'Iberville (1661–1706), founder of the French colony of Louisiana of New France
 Iron Eyes Cody (1904–1999), actor; native of Kaplan
 Walter Isaacson (born 1952), author; journalist; president and chief executive officer, Aspen Institute
 Barry Ivey (born 1979), politician

J

 George W. Jack (1875–1924), federal judge
 Wellborn Jack (1907–1991), state representative from Caddo Parish (1940–64)
 Whitfield Jack (1906–1989), Shreveport attorney and United States Army colonel in World War II and United States Army Reserve major general
 Donte Jackson (born 1995), NFL cornerback
 John M. Jackson (born 1950), actor, JAG Lisa Jackson (born 1962), administrator of the Environmental Protection Agency under Barack Obama
 Mahalia Jackson (1911–1972), gospel singer
 Randy Jackson (born 1956), musician, entrepreneur, television personality
 Randy Jackson (born 1955), guitarist and lead singer of rock band Zebra
 Tyson Jackson (born 1986), defensive tackle for the Atlanta Falcons
 Brandon Jacobs (born 1982), running back for the New York Giants
 Angie Jakusz (1980–2021), Contestant on Survivor: Palau
 Bradie James (born 1981), linebacker for the Houston Texans
 Antawn Jamison (born 1976), NBA player for the Los Angeles Lakers
 Rajarsi Janakananda (1892–1955), former president of the Self-Realization Fellowship
 JayDaYoungan (born 1998), rapper
 Lemuel Jeanpierre (born 1987), center for the Seattle Seahawks
 Patrick O. Jefferson (born 1968), state representative for Bienville, Claiborne, and Lincoln parishes (since 2012); lawyer in Arcadia
 Eddie Jemison (born 1963), actor, Hung, Bruce Almighty, and Ocean's Eleven and its sequels
 Faith Jenkins (born 20th century), attorney, legal commentator, Miss Louisiana 2000
 Mykel Shannon Jenkins (born 1969), actor, The Bold and the Beautiful Woody Jenkins (born 1947), politician, newspaper publisher
 Bobby Jindal (born 1971), Governor of Louisiana
 Ronnie Johns (born 1949), politician
 Andrew R. Johnson (1856–1933), state senator and mayor of Homer; named Ashland, Louisiana
 Avery Johnson (born 1965), NBA player and coach
 Bernette Joshua Johnson (born 1943), Chief Justice of the Louisiana Supreme Court since 2013; associate justice, 1994–2013
 Bill Johnson (1872–1972), jazz musician
 Damaris Johnson (born 1989), wide receiver and punt returner for the Philadelphia Eagles
 Mike Johnson (born 1972), U.S. Representative for Louisiana's 4th congressional district since 2017; former state representative and constitutional attorney from Bossier Parish
 Quinn Johnson (born 1986), fullback for the Green Bay Packers
 John Bennett Johnston Jr. (born 1932), U.S. Senator (1972–97); lobbyist (since 1997); state senator (1968–72); state representative (1964–68)
 Toya Johnson (born 1983), actress
 Bert Jones (born 1951), football quarterback, LSU and NFL's Baltimore Colts
 Chad Jones (born 1988), safety for the New York Giants
 Deion Jones (born 1994), linebacker for the Atlanta Falcons
 Donnie Jones (born 1980), punter for the Philadelphia Eagles
 Dub Jones (born 1924), NFL and AAFC running back
 Edgar Jones (born 1984), linebacker for the Kansas City Chiefs
 Jacoby Jones (born 1984), wide receiver for the Baltimore Ravens
 Perry Jones III (born 1991), player for the Oklahoma City Thunder
 Ralph Waldo Emerson Jones (1905–1982), president and baseball coach at Grambling State University (1936–77)
 Henderson Jordan (1896–1958), Bienville Parish sheriff, in posse that ambushed Bonnie and Clyde
 Michael I. Jordan (born 1956), Professor at University of California, Berkeley, researcher in machine learning and artificial intelligence
 J. E. Jumonville Jr. (born 1942), state senator and horse breeder from Pointe Coupee Parish
 Juvenile (born 1975), rapper

K
 Kelly Keeling (born 1966), singer-songwriter from Houma
 Perry Keith (1847–1935), politician
 William P. Kellogg (1830–1918), Member of Congress; Governor; United States Senator
 Iris Kelso (1926–2003), New Orleans journalist
 Bolivar E. Kemp (1871–1933), U.S. representative (1925–33)
 Bolivar Edwards Kemp Jr. (1904–1965), Louisiana Attorney General (1948–52)
 John Neely Kennedy (born 1951), Louisiana State Treasurer
 Robert F. Kennon (1902–1988), Governor of Louisiana (1952–56)
 Doug Kershaw (born 1936), musician, singer
 Sammy Kershaw (born 1958), musician; singer; candidate for Lieutenant Governor of Louisiana
 Ernie K-Doe (1936–2001), singer; billed himself as the "Emperor of the Universe"
 DJ Khaled (born 1975), record producer; radio personality; DJ; record label executive
 Nat G. Kiefer (1939–1985), state senator from New Orleans
 Catherine D. Kimball (born 1945), retired chief justice of the Louisiana Supreme Court
 Claude King (1923–2013), country singer-songwriter; known for "Wolverton Mountain"
 Earl King (1934–2003), musician
 Ralph E. King (1902–1974), physician; state senator from Franklin Parish
 Edith Killgore Kirkpatrick (1918–2014), music educator; former member of Louisiana Board of Regents
 Mark Klein (born 1993), singer
 Neil Haven Klock (1896–1978), sugar planter; politician from Rapides Parish
 Jeannette Knoll (born 1943), associate justice of the Louisiana Supreme Court
 Jesse Monroe Knowles (1919–2006), politician; survivor of the Bataan Death March during World War II

L

 John LaBruzzo (born 1970), politician
 Eddie Lacy (born 1990), running back for the Green Bay Packers
 Ed Lafitte (1886–1971), baseball player
 Jean Lafitte (c. 1780 – c. 1826), blacksmith; pirate
 Juan LaFonta (born 1972), former state representative for Orleans Parish and New Orleans lawyer
 Papa Jack Laine (1873–1966), bandleader
 Maxie Lambright (1924–1980), football coach
 Dorothy Lamour (1914–1996), actress
 Katherine LaNasa (born 1966), actress, Judging Amy Mary Landrieu (born 1955), US Senator
 Mitch Landrieu (born 1960), politician
 Moon Landrieu (born 1930), judge, politician
 Ali Landry (born 1973), actress; model; Miss USA (1996)
 Jarvis Landry (born 1992), wide receiver for the Miami Dolphins
 Jeff Landry (born 1970), politician
 Lisa Landry (born 1977), comedian
 Nancy Landry (born 1962), politician
 Eric Laneuville (born 1952), actor; television director, St. Elsewhere, Room 222 Nick LaRocca (1889–1961), self-proclaimed "inventor of jazz"
 John Larroquette (born 1947), actor
 Hank Lauricella (1930–2014), football player; state senator
 Marie Laveau (c 1794 – c. 1881), Voodoo priestess
 Theodore K. Lawless (1892–1971), dermatologist, medical researcher, and philanthropist
 Claude "Buddy" Leach (born 1934), politician; businessman
 Lead Belly (1885–1949), musician
 Ronald Leary (born 1989), guard for the Dallas Cowboys
 Dudley J. LeBlanc (1894–1971), politician; businessman; made a fortune in the patent medicine Hadacol
 Fred S. LeBlanc – politician
 Samuel A. LeBlanc I (1886–1955), lawyer; state representative; state court judge; grandfather of Sam A. LeBlanc III
 Conway LeBleu (1918–2007), state representative for Calcasieu and Cameron parishes, 1964–88 
 Richard Leche (1898–1965), Governor of Louisiana
 Joseph E. LeDoux (born 1949), neuroscientist
 David Lee (born 1943), football player
 Harry Lee (1932–2007), Jefferson Parish sheriff
 Rory Lee (born 1949), president of Louisiana College (1997–2004)
 Keith Lehr (born 1963), two-time World Series of Poker bracelet winner, born and resides in Bossier City 
 John A. Lejeune (1867–1942), Marine Corps general
 Don Lemon (born 1966), journalist and television anchor; host of CNN Newsroom Elmore Leonard (1925–2013), crime and western novelist; born in New Orleans
 Jim Leslie (1937–1976), journalist; advertising executive; assassinated in Baton Rouge
 Jared Leto (born 1971), actor; lead singer and guitarist of the alternative rock band Thirty Seconds to Mars
 Shannon Leto (born 1970), drummer of the alternative rock band Thirty Seconds to Mars, occasional actor
 Zachary Levi (born 1980), actor, Less than Perfect, Chuck Jerry Lee Lewis (1935-2022), musician
 Keenan Lewis (born 1986),  cornerback for the New Orleans Saints
 Michael Lewis (born 1960),  author; financial journalist; Moneyball, The Blind Side Patrick Lewis (born 1991), center for the Seattle Seahawks
 Rashard Lewis (born 1979), forward for the Orlando Magic
 Lil Wayne (born Dwayne Michael Carter Jr.), rapper
 Coleman Lindsey (1892–1968), politician
 Meghan Linsey (born 1985), musician, singer/songwriter, and contestant on The Voice season 8
 F. A. Little Jr. (born 1936), judge of the United States District Court for the Western District of Louisiana
 Little Walter (1930–1968), blues harmonica player
 Lloyd Harlin Polite (born 1986), R&B singer
 Nate Livings (born 1982), guard for the Dallas Cowboys
 Bob Livingston (born 1943), Member of Congress (1977–99)
 Edward Livingston (1764–1836), Member of Congress; United States Secretary of State
 Lloyd (born 1986), contemporary R&B and hip hop artist
 Bennie Logan (born 1989), nose tackle for the Philadelphia Eagles
 Earl Kemp Long (1895–1960), Governor of Louisiana (1939–40, 1948–52 and 1956–60)
 George S. Long (1883–1958), US Representative
 Gerald Long (born 1944), Republican state senator from Natchitoches; only elected Republican official of the Long family
 Huey Pierce Long Jr. (1893–1935), Governor of Louisiana; US Senator
 Jimmy D. Long (1931–2016), politician
 Russell Long (1918–2003), US Senator
 Speedy O. Long (1928–2006), US Representative; district attorney from La Salle Parish
 Professor Longhair (1918–1980), musician
 John L. Loos (1918–2011), historian
 Joseph Lopinto (born c. 1976), state representative from Jefferson Parish
 Morris Lottinger Jr. (born c. 1938), politician
 Morris Lottinger Sr. (1902–1978), politician
 Lance Louis (born 1985), offensive guard for the Indianapolis Colts
 Aaron Loup (born 1987), relief pitcher for the Toronto Blue Jays
 Fred L. Lowery (born 1943), clergyman; author
 Bobby Lowther (1923–2015), only two-sport (basketball and track and field) All-American at Louisiana State University (1946)
 Cornelius Lucas (born 1991), offensive tackle for the Detroit Lions
 Robert L. Lynn (1931–2020), president of Louisiana College from 1975 to 1997
 Ted Lyons (1900–1986), Hall of Fame baseball player

M

 Sherman Q. Mack (born 1972), politician
 Anthony Mackie (born 1979), actor, Million Dollar Baby, The Hurt Locker, Captain America Magic Sam (1937–1969), blues music pioneer
 John Maginnis (1948–2014), journalist; author
 Mikie Mahtook (born 1989), outfielder for the Tampa Bay Rays
 Karl Malone (born 1963), Hall of Fame basketball player, mainly with the Utah Jazz
 Jeff Mangum (born 1970), musician; founder of Neutral Milk Hotel
 Robert "Bob" Mann (born 1958), journalist, historian
 Archie Manning (born 1949), former New Orleans Saints quarterback; father of Eli, Cooper and Peyton
 Cooper Manning (born 1974), television personality; brother of Eli and Peyton
 Eli Manning (born 1981), New York Giants quarterback; son of Archie Manning; brother of Peyton and Cooper 
 Peyton Manning (born 1976), retired Denver Broncos quarterback; son of Archie Manning; brother of Eli and Cooper 
 Tommy Manzella (born 1983), shortstop for the Colorado Rockies
 "Pistol" Pete Maravich (1947–1988), basketball player, LSU and NBA Hall of Famer
 Paul Mares (1900–1949), musician
 Anna Margaret (born 1996), singer
 Angélica María (born 1944), Mexican actress and singer
 Robert M. Marionneaux (born 1968), politician
 Branford Marsalis (born 1960), musician
 Ellis Marsalis Jr. (1934–2020), musician; educator
 Ellis Marsalis Sr. (1908–2004), poultry farmer; jazz musician; hotelier; civil rights activist
 Wynton Marsalis (born 1961), musician
 Leonard Marshall (born 1961), former defensive end, primarily for the New York Giants
 Samuel W. Martien (1854–1946), planter; politician
 Jarell Martin (born 1994), basketball player for Maccabi Tel Aviv of the Israeli Basketball Premier League 
 Danny Martiny (born 1951), politician
 Rod Masterson (1945–2013), actor 
 Tyrann Mathieu (born 1992), free safety and cornerback for the Arizona Cardinals
 Vance McAllister (born 1974), U.S. representative from Louisiana's 5th congressional district
 Jay McCallum (born 1960), justice of the Louisiana Supreme Court; former state representative for Lincoln and Union parishes
 James T. McCalman (1914–1977), state senator from Claiborne and Bienville parishes (1960–64)
 Todd McClure (born 1977), center for the Atlanta Falcons
 John McConathy (1930–2016), professional basketball player and educator
 Mike McConathy (born 1955), basketball coach at Northwestern State University since 1999; son of John McConathy
 Billy McCormack (1928–2012), Southern Baptist clergyman; national director of the Christian Coalition of America
 Jim McCrery (born 1949), US Representative
 Sidney McCrory (1911–1985), Louisiana Commissioner of Agriculture and Forestry (1956–60)
 Jack McFarland (born 1969), state representative from Winn Parish, effective 2016
 Eugene McGehee (1928–2014), state legislator; judge; from East Baton Rouge Parish
 Tim McGraw (born 1967), country musician; actor
 John McKeithen (1918–1999), Governor of Louisiana (1964–72)
 W. Fox McKeithen (1946–2005), Louisiana secretary of state (1988–2005)
 Charles E. McKenzie (1896–1956), U.S. representative
 Baylus Benjamin McKinney (1886–1952), Christian singer-songwriter
 Joe McKnight (born 1988), tailback for the New York Jets
 A. J. McNamara (1936–2014), state representative; U.S. District Judge from Jefferson Parish 
 Gil Meche (born 1978), MLB pitcher
 Leon C. Megginson (1921–2010), LSU professor noted for his clarifying statements about Darwinism 
 D. L. Menard (1932–2017), Cajun musician from Erath
 Adah Isaacs Menken (1835–1868), actress
 Emile Meyer (1910–1987), actor
Jerome Meyinsse (born 1988), basketball player in the Israeli Basketball Premier League
 Quintin Mikell (born 1980), safety for the St. Louis Rams
 Lizzie Miles (1895–1963), singer
 Wade Miley (born 1986), relief pitcher for the Houston Astros
 Roderick Miller (1924–2005), politician; lawyer
 Percy "Master P" Miller (born 1967), musician; actor; record producer; athlete
 Fred H. Mills Jr. (born 1955), politician, pharmacist, banker
 Jordan Mills (born 1990), offensive tackle for the Chicago Bears
 Newt V. Mills (1899–1996), U.S. representative
 Paul Millsap (born 1985), power forward for the Utah Jazz
 Alexander Milne (1742–1838), businessman; slave trader; philanthropist
 Barkevious Mingo (born 1990), outside linebacker for the New England Patriots
 H. Lane Mitchell (1895–1978), Shreveport commissioner of public works (1934–68)
 RJ Mitte (born 1992), actor, Walt Jr. on Breaking Bad Beth Mizell (born 1952), state senator for St. Tammany, Tangipahoa, and Washington parishes since 2016
 Randy Moffett (born 1947), educator
 Bill Monroe (1920–2011), journalist, host of Meet the Press (1975–84)
 Greg Monroe (born 1990), center for the Detroit Pistons
 Billy Montgomery (born 1937), politician; former educator
 Little Brother Montgomery (c. 1906–1985), musician
 Chris Mooney (born 1977), journalist and author 
 Cleo Moore (1923–1973), actress (1950s)
 Danny Roy Moore (1925–c. 2020), state senator from Claiborne Parish (1964–68)
 Ellen Bryan Moore (1912–1999), Register of State Lands; captain in Women's Army Corps during World War II
 Mewelde Moore (born 1982), running back for the Indianapolis Colts
 W. Henson Moore (born 1939), US Representative
 Jackie Moreland (1938–1971), professional basketball player
 Aaron Morgan (born 1988), outside linebacker and defensive end for the Tampa Bay Buccaneers
 Cecil Morgan (1898–1999), state legislator; led the impeachment forces against Huey Pierce Long Jr.; executive with Standard Oil Company; dean of Tulane University Law School
 Elemore Morgan Jr. (1931–2008), landscape painter and photographer
 Lewis L. Morgan (1876–1950), U.S. representative; gubernatorial runoff candidate (1944)
 Dutch Morial (1929–1989), judge; mayor of New Orleans 
 Sergio Rossetti Morosini (born 1953), Diplomat, Artist, Author; 1975 Honorary Louisiana State Senator
 Cynthia Hedge-Morrell (born 1947), member of the New Orleans City Council
 Jean-Paul Morrell (born 1978), New Orleans lawyer and member of both houses of the Louisiana State Legislature
 Jay Morris (born 1958), state representative from Ouachita and Morehouse parishes
 deLesseps Morrison Jr. (1944–1996), state representative from Orleans Parish
 deLesseps S. "Chep" Morrison (1912–1964), mayor of New Orleans; ambassador to the Organization of American States; three-time gubernatorial candidate
 Logan Morrison (born 1987), outfielder and first baseman for the Seattle Mariners
 Morgus the Magnificent – fictional horror host (1950s–1980s)
 Paul Morphy (1837–1884), world chess champion
 Garrett Morris (born 1937), actor and comedian, Saturday Night Live Isaac Edward Morse (1809–1866), Attorney General of Louisiana; US Member of Congress
 Jelly Roll Morton (1890–1941), musician; composer; self-proclaimed "inventor of jazz"
 Alicia Morton (born 1987), actress
 Alexander Mouton (1804–1885), Governor; United States Senator
 Jonas Mouton (born 1988), linebacker for the San Diego Chargers
 Bernhard Müller (1788–1834), colonizer
 W. Spencer Myrick (1913–2001), state legislator from West Carroll Parish

N
 Ray Nagin (born 1956), mayor of New Orleans during Hurricane Katrina; convicted felon
 Edward F. Neild (1884–1955), architect; from Shreveport
 Ed Nelson (1928–2014), actor, Peyton Place Aaron Neville (born 1941), singer
 Arthel Neville (born 1962), anchor for Fox News
 Drake Nevis (born 1989), defensive tackle for the Dallas Cowboys
 Josephine Louise Newcomb (1816–1901), philanthropist (Newcomb College)
Malik Newman (born 1997), basketball player in the Israeli Basketball Premier League
 Randy Newman (born 1943), singer-songwriter; pianist
 Francis T. Nicholls (1834–1912), Governor of Louisiana
 Lance E. Nichols (born 1955), actor, Treme J. Kelly Nix (born 1934), politician; businessman
 Taurean Nixon (born 1991), cornerback for the Denver Broncos
 James A. Noe (1890–1976), Governor of Louisiana (for five months in 1936); oil driller; broadcaster
 Rico Noel (born 1989), outfielder for the New York Yankees
 Aaron Nola (born 1993), MLB All Star baseball pitcher
 William Wiley Norris III (1936–2016), city, district, and circuit court judge from West Monroe  
 Solomon Northrup (1807–1863), abolitionist 
 Alcide Nunez (1884–1934), musician
 Samuel B. Nunez Jr. (1930–2012), politician
 William Harold "Billy" Nungesser (born 1959), Republican politician

O

 Prentiss Oakley (1905–1957), Bienville Parish sheriff (1940–52); in posse that ambushed Bonnie and Clyde in 1934
 Frank Ocean (born 1987), Grammy Award-nominated R&B singer
 Alton Ochsner (1896–1981), surgeon; medical researcher
 Bob Odom (1935–2014), state agriculture commissioner (1980–2008); longest-serving individual in that office
 Arthur J. O'Keefe Sr. (1876–1943), mayor of New Orleans (1926–29)
 Michael H. O'Keefe (1931–2021), politician; convicted felon
 Henry Warren Ogden (1842–1905), politician
 Shaquille O'Neal – former LSU and NBA player, Basketball Hall of Famer
 Joe "King" Oliver (1885–1938), jazz musician
 Virgil Orr (1923–2021), state representative; vice president, Louisiana Tech University
 Joe Osborn (1937–2018), musician
 Kenneth Osterberger (1930–2016), state senator from East Baton Rouge Parish, 1972 to 1992; former opponent of David Duke
 Lee Harvey Oswald (1939–1963), presumed assassin of U.S. President John F. Kennedy
 George T. Oubre (1918–1998), politician; from St. James Parish
 Darrell Ourso (born 1964), member of the Louisiana House of Representatives from East Baton Rouge Parish (since 2015)
 Jessel Ourso (1932–1978), sheriff of Iberville Parish
 John H. Overton (1875–1948), US Senator
 Mel Ott (1909–1958), Hall of Fame baseball player
 Don Owen (1930–2012), news anchor, politician

P

 Robert Pack (born 1969), NBA player and coach
 Frank Page (1925–2013), radio broadcaster, KWKH in Shreveport
 James George Palmer (1875–1952), Mayor of Shreveport (1930–32); Judge, Louisiana Circuit Court of Appeals (1932–33)
 Jonathan Papelbon (born 1980), closer for the Philadelphia Phillies
 Robert Parish (born 1953), Hall of Fame basketball player
 John M. Parker (1863–1939), Governor of Louisiana (1920–24)
 John Victor Parker (1928–2014), federal judge (1979–2014)
 Mel Parnell (1922–2012), pitcher for the Boston Red Sox
 Edward Grady Partin (1924–1990), Teamsters Union business agent in Baton Rouge
 Otto Passman (1900–1988), U.S. Representative
 William S. Patout III (1932–2017), sugar grower in Iberia Parish 
 Carly Patterson (born 1988), Olympic gold medalist in gymnastics
 Elfrid Payton (born 1994), Point guard for the Orlando Magic of the National Basketball Association
 Nicholas Payton (born 1973), musician
 Joe Raymond Peace (born 1945), football coach
 Kevin Pearson (born 1959), politician
 Jesse Pearson (1930–1979), actor and screenwriter
 William S. Peck Sr. (1873–1946), politician
 Harvey Peltier Jr. (1923–1980), politician
 Harvey Peltier Sr. (1899–1977), politician
 Leander Perez (1891–1969), District judge; political boss of St. Bernard and Plaquemine parishes (1919–69)
 Tony Perkins (born 1963), conservative politician; head of the Family Research Council
 Ralph Perlman (1917–2013), state budget director (1967–88)
 Pauley Perrette (born 1969), singer and actress (NCIS)
 Ryan Perrilloux (born 1987), quarterback
 Jonathan W. Perry (born 1973), politician
 Tyler Perry (born 1969), television and film producer, writer, actor, director
 Jace Peterson (born 1990), second baseman for the Atlanta Braves
 Bob Pettit (born 1932), Hall of Fame basketball player (1954–65)
 Andy Pettitte (born 1972), former starting pitcher for the New York Yankees and Houston Astros
 Marguerite Piazza (1921–2012), operatic soprano
 Abe E. Pierce III (1934–2021), politician; educator
 Webb Pierce (1921–1991), singer
 Wendell Pierce (born 1962), actor, Bunk Moreland on The Wire Juan Pierre (born 1977), outfielder for the Miami Marlins
 P.B.S. Pinchback (1837–1921), politician, Governor of Louisiana
 Glen Pitre (born 1955), filmmaker
 Loulan Pitre Jr. (born 1961), lawyer in New Orleans; former state representative for Lafourche Parish 
 Montgomery Pittman (1917–1962), actor, screenwriter, producer, known for 77 Sunset Strip Vance Plauché (1897-1976) -  U.S. Representative, 1941 to 1943
 Dustin Poirier (born 1989), UFC fighter
 Leonidas Polk (1806–1864), Confederate general; Episcopal bishop; founder of Sewanee: The University of the South
 Tracy Porter (born 1986), cornerback for the Oakland Raiders
 Dante Powell, stand-up comedian
 Mike Powell (born 1961), Shreveport politician
 Robert E. Powell (1923–1997), mayor of Monroe from 1979 to 1996
 Julien de Lallande Poydras (1740–1824), poet, politician
 Phil Preis (born 1950), politician
 Sister Helen Prejean (born 1938), activist
 Arthur T. Prescott (1863–1942), educator and founding president of Louisiana Tech University
 Dak Prescott (born 1993), quarterback for the Dallas Cowboys
 Edward J. Price (born 1953), state representative for Ascension, Iberville, and St. James parishes (since 2012)
 Louis Prima (1910–1978), musician, entertainer
 Professor Longhair (1918–1980), musician
 Albin Provosty (1865–1932), politician from New Roads
 Paul Prudhomme (1940–2015), chef

Q
 Chris Quinn (born 1983), point guard for the New Jersey Nets

R

 Paul Rae (born 1968), actor
 Max Rafferty (1917–1982), author ;educator; California politician
 Henry Ragas (1897–1919), early jazz pianist
 Kevin Rahm (born 1971), actor
 Tanner Rainey (born 1992), relief pitcher for the Washington Nationals
 Melvin Rambin (1941–2001), politician; banker
 Rueben Randle (born 1991), wide receiver for the New York Giants
 Kevin Rankin (born 1976), actor, Friday Night Lights, Trauma, Unforgettable Ed Rand (1920–1999), state representative from Rapides Parish (1960–64)
 Joseph E. Ransdell (1858–1954), U.S. representative from Louisiana's 5th congressional district; U.S. senator (1913–31)
 John Rarick (1924–2009), US Representative; state court judge
 Clyde V. Ratcliff (1879–1952), politician; planter
 Eddy Raven (born 1944), singer-songwriter
 Shawn Reaves (born 1978), actor
 Mac "Dr John" Rebbenack (born 1940), pianist, singer-songwriter
 Ed Reed (born 1978), NFL free safety
 Willis Reed (1941–2019), Hall of Fame basketball player with the New York Knicks; NBA head coach
 Pee Wee Reese (1918–1999), Hall of Fame shortstop for the Brooklyn and Los Angeles Dodgers
 Godfrey Reggio (born 1940), filmmaker
 Eric Reid (born 1991), safety for the San Francisco 49ers
 Ed Renwick (1938–2020), political scientist
 Darius Reynaud (born 1985), wide receiver and running back for the Tennessee Titans
 Slater Rhea (Shuai De), American singer and TV personality famous in China; born in Alexandria
 Doris Lindsey Holland Rhodes (1909–1997), politician
 Anne Rice (1941–2021), author
 Jerome "Dee" Richard (born 1955), politician
 Teddy Riley (1924–1992), jazz trumpeter
 Norbert Rilleaux (1806–1894), inventor; engineer
 Neil Riser (born 1962), state senator, 2008 to 2020;  state representative since 2020
 Randy Roach (born 1951), mayor of Lake Charles since 2000
 Cokie Roberts (1943–2019), television journalist; author; daughter of Hale Boggs and Lindy Boggs
 Kay Robertson (born 1950), television personality
 Phil Robertson (born 1946), television personality
 Si Robertson (born 1948), television personality
 Scotty Robertson (1930–2011), basketball coach
 Greg Robinson (born 1992), offensive tackle for the St. Louis Rams
 W. C. Robinson (1861–1914), educator
 George Rodrigue (1944–2013), "Blue Dog" artist
 Buddy Roemer (1943–2021), governor of Louisiana (1988–92)
 Charles E. Roemer II (1923–2012), state commissioner of administration (1972–80)
 Ned Romero (1925–2017), actor; originally from Franklin
 Ralph L. Ropp (1897–1982), president of Louisiana Tech University (1949–62)
 Leon Roppolo (1902–1943), musician
 Jacques Roy (born 1970), mayor of Alexandria (since 2006)
 Alvin Benjamin Rubin (1920–1991), federal judge
 Barry Rubin (born 1957), Head Strength and Conditioning Coach of the Kansas City Chiefs in the NFL
 Bill Russell (born 1934), Hall of Fame center for the Boston Celtics; NBA coach
 Weldon Russell (born 1946), politician; businessman

S

 Jeffrey D. Sadow (born 1962), political scientist; columnist; educator
 Larry Sale (1893–1977), sheriff of Claiborne Parish
 Joe R. Salter (born 1943), politician, educator
 A. T. "Apple" Sanders Jr. (1926–1989), member of the Louisiana House of Representatives from East Baton Rouge Parish (1956–64)
 Kurtis Scaletta – writer
 Clay Schexnayder (born 1969), state representative; businessman
 John Schroder (born 1961), former state representative from Covington; businessman
 Mike Scifres (born 1980), punter for the San Diego Chargers
 Ashley Scott (born 1977), actress, model, Jericho, Dark Angel, Birds of Prey Nauman Scott (1916–2001), U.S. District Court judge
 Pat Screen (1943–1994), mayor-president of East Baton Rouge Parish (1981–88)
 Alan Seabaugh (born 1967), state representative
 J.C. Seaman (1898–1964), state representative from Tensas Parish (1944–64)
 Sam Seamans (born 1967), Anglican Church bishop in Mountain Home, Arkansas; born in Morgan City
 Aaron Selber Jr. (1927–2013), businessman and philanthropist
 Joe Sevario (born 1944), state senator from Ascension Parish, 1976–94
 Henry Clay Sevier (1896–1974), politician
 V. C. Shannon (1910–1989), politician
 Amanda Shaw (born 1990), actress; singer; fiddler
 B. L. Shaw (1933-2018) - former state senator, educator
 Rhonda Shear (born 1954), beauty queen; television host
 Ben Sheets (born 1978), MLB pitcher
 Virginia Shehee (1923-2015) -first woman elected to Louisiana Senate
 Clarence Shelmon (born 1952), NFL offensive coordinator
 Kenny Wayne Shepherd (born 1977), musician
 Alana Shipp (born 1982), American-Israeli IFBB professional bodybuilder
 Chris Shivers (born 1978), professional bull rider
 Henry Miller Shreve (1785–1854), inventor; steamboat captain
 Phil Short (born 1947), state senator; relocated to Virginia
 Rockin' Sidney (1938–1998), Zydeco musician
 Richard Simmons (born 1948), fitness authority; television personality
 Scott M. Simon (born 1961), state representative
 Tharold Simon (born 1991), cornerback for the Seattle Seahawks
 Frank P. Simoneaux (born 1933), state representative from East Baton Rouge Parish (1972–82)
 C. O. Simpkins Sr. (1925–2019), state representative from Shreveport; civil rights activist, and dentist 
 Cuthbert Ormond Simpkins Jr. (born 1947), physician and historian, reared in Shreveport
 Oramel H. Simpson (1870–1932), Governor of Louisiana (1926–28)
 Fulwar Skipwith (1765–1839), diplomat; politician
 Eric Skrmetta (born 1958), politician
 John Slidell (1793–1871), U.S. Senator; Confederate diplomat
 Soulja Slim (1977–2003), musician
 Donald Sloan (born 1988), guard for the Atlanta Hawks
 Argile Smith (born 1955), interim president of Louisiana College (2014–15)
 George Luke Smith (1837–1884), U.S. representative from Louisiana's 4th congressional district
 Howard K. Smith (1914–2002), television journalist; reporter
 James Peyton Smith (1925–2006), politician
 Jasper K. Smith (1905–1992), politician
 John R. Smith (born 1945), politician
 Otis Smith (born 1965), New England Patriots cornerback; Kansas City Chiefs assistant coach
 Patricia Haynes Smith (born 1946), state representative from Baton Rouge
 Jefferson B. Snyder (1859–1951), politician
 Robert H. Snyder (1855–1905), politician
 Guy Sockrider (1921–2011), politician
 Steven Soderbergh (born 1963), film producer; screenwriter; cinematographer; director
 Floyd Soileau (born 1938), record producer
 Ian Somerhalder (born 1978), actor; model
 Art Sour (1924–2000), State Representative from Shreveport (1972–92)
 James Z. Spearing (1864–1942), politician
 Britney Spears (born 1981), singer; actress
 Bryan Spears (born 1977), film and television producer
 Jamie Lynn Spears (born 1991), actress; singer
 Lynne Spears (born 1955), author
 Marcus Spears (born 1983), defensive end for the Dallas Cowboys
 Freddie Spencer (born 1961), world motorcycle champion
 Mason Spencer (1892–1962), politician
 Tommy Spinks (1948–2007), football player
 Tam Spiva (1932–2017), screenwriter
 Frank Spooner (born 1937), businessman and politician
 Grove Stafford (1897–1975), state senator for Rapides Parish, 1940–48
 Leroy Augustus Stafford (1822–1864), Confederate brigadier general
 Tom Stagg (1923–2015), Judge of the United States District Court for the Western District of Louisiana
 Rusty Staub (1944–2018), MLB right fielder, designated hitter, and first baseman
 Craig Steltz (born 1986), safety for the Chicago Bears
 Alton Sterling (1979–2016), black man fatally shot by a police officer in Baton Rouge
 Kordell Stewart (born 1972), NFL quarterback and wide receiver
 Ford E. Stinson (1914–1989), lawyer and state legislator from Bossier Parish
 Julie Stokes (born 1969), state representative from Jefferson Parish
 Brandon Stokley (born 1976), wide receiver for the Denver Broncos
Johnathan Stove (born 1995), basketball player for Hapoel Galil Elyon of the Israeli Basketball Premier League
 Michael G. Strain (born 1959), veterinarian; state representative; Commissioner of the Louisiana Departmentof Agriculture and Forestry
 Roy C. Strickland (1942–2010), businessman, politician
 Raymond Strother (born 1940), political consultant
 Patrick Surtain (born 1976), NFL cornerback
 Hal Sutton (born 1958), PGA Tour golfer
 Jimmy Swaggart (born 1935), evangelist
 Marc Swayze (1913–2012), comic book writer and illustrator
 Stromile Swift (born 1979), NBA player
 Harold Sylvester (born 1949), actor, Married... with Children, Today's F.B.I., Shaky GroundT

 Joseph Talamo (born 1990), jockey
 Kirk Talbot (born 1969), state representative from Jefferson Parish
 Irvin Talton – member of the Louisiana House of Representatives for Webster Parish (1880–84)
 Elmer R. Tapper (1929–2011), politician
 Gregory Tarver (born 1946), civil rights activist, state senator from Caddo Parish
 Ray Tarver (1921–1972), dentist; represented Natchitoches Parish in state House of Representatives (1964–68) 
 Albert Tate (1920–1986), state and federal judge
 Billy Tauzin (born 1943), US Representative;  lobbyist
 Dorothy Mae Taylor (1928–2000), first African-American woman in the Louisiana House of Representatives (1971–80)
 Ike Taylor (born 1980), cornerback for the Pittsburgh Steelers
 Jim Taylor (1935–2018), Hall of Fame fullback, primarily with the Green Bay Packers
 Richard Taylor (1826–1879), Confederate general
 Zachary Taylor (1784–1850), 12th President of the United States; US Army general
 Lloyd George Teekell (1922–1996), politician
 Garrett Temple (born 1986), point guard for the San Antonio Spurs
 Suzanne Haik Terrell (born 1954), politician
 Byron Thames (born 1969), actor and musician, Father Murphy Sam H. Theriot (born 1954), politician
 Ryan Theriot (born 1979), infielder for the San Francisco Giants
 Major Thibaut (born 1977), politician
 Keith Thibodeaux (born 1950), actor
 Ledricka Thierry (born 1978), politician
 Dallas Thomas (born 1989), offensive tackle for the Miami Dolphins
 Mike Thomas (born 1987), wide receiver for the Jacksonville Jaguars
 Tyrus Thomas (born 1986), power forward for the Charlotte Bobcats
 Jeff R. Thompson (born 1965), politician
 Ken Thompson (born 1943), pioneer of computer science
 T. Ashton Thompson (1916–1965), U.S. representative
 Marcus Thornton (born 1987), shooting guard for the New Orleans Hornets
 George H. Tichenor (1837–1923), surgeon; pioneer in antiseptics
 David Toms (born 1967), PGA Tour golfer
 Charles Emery Tooke Jr. (1912–1986), lawyer; state senator
 John Kennedy Toole (1937–1969), author of Pulitzer Prize-winning A Confederacy of Dunces Reggie Torbor (born 1981), former NFL linebacker
 Wayne Toups (born 1958), musician
 Allen Toussaint (1938–2015), New Orleans musician; composer; record producer
 John D. Travis (1940–2016), state representative from East Feliciana Parish, 1984 to 2000
 David C. Treen (1928–2009), US Representative (1973–80); Governor of Louisiana (1980–84)
 Paul Tulane (1801–1887), businessman; philanthropist
 Ben Turpin (1869–1940), silent film comedian
 Odessa Turner (born 1964), NFL wide receiver
 Trai Turner (born 1993), guard for the Carolina Panthers
 Marshall H. Twitchell (1840–1905), politician; planter, diplomat

U
 Chris Ullo (1928–2014), member of both houses of the state legislature from Jefferson Parish (1972–2008)

V

 Steve Van Buren (1920–2012), Hall of Fame halfback for the Philadelphia Eagles
 Rose Van Thyn (1921–2010), Holocaust survivor in Shreveport
 Andrew Varona – race car driver
 Troy Verges (born 20th century), country music songwriter
 Jeffrey P. Victory (born 1946), associate justice of the Louisiana Supreme Court
 Jacques Villeré (1760–1830), Creole; Governor of Louisiana; general
 Pruitt Taylor Vince (born 1960), film and television character actor
 David Vitter (born 1961), U.S. Senator
 Jeffrey Vitter (born 1955), computer science professor and researcher; 17th chancellor of the University of Mississippi
 John Volz (1936–2011), U.S. attorney; prosecuted high-profile corruption cases in the 1980s
Theo Von (born 1980), comedian and podcaster
 Cole Vosbury (born 1991), singer-songwriter, musician, and contestant on The Voice season 5

W

 David Wade (1911–1990), general
 Thomas M. Wade (1860–1929), politician; educator
 Von Wafer (born 1985), shooting guard for the Orlando Magic
 Joseph David Waggonner Jr. (1918–2007), U.S. representative from Louisiana's 4th congressional district
 W. E. "Willie" Waggonner (1905–1976), sheriff of Bossier Parish (1948–76)
 Bryan Wagner (1943–2018), Republican politician; former member of the New Orleans City Council
 Madam C. J. Walker (1867–1919), business tycoon
 Joseph Marshall Walker (1786–1856), Governor of Louisiana
 Lillian W. Walker (1923–2016), politician
 Taijuan Walker (born 1992), starting pitcher for the Arizona Diamondbacks
 Mike Wallace (born 1986), wide receiver for the Pittsburgh Steelers
 Ray Walston (1914–2001) actor – My Favorite Martian Donald Ellsworth Walter (born 1936), former U.S. attorney; U.S. district judge in Shreveport
 Rick Ward III (born 1982), state senator from Iberville Parish
 Henry C. Warmoth (1842–1931), Governor of Louisiana during Reconstruction
 Ron Washington (born 1952), manager for the Texas Rangers
 J. Louis Watkins Jr. (1929–1997), judge; politician
 John D. Watkins (1828–1895), state senator and judge in Webster Parish
 John T. Watkins (1854–1925), state court judge; U.S. representative for Louisiana's 4th congressional district (1905–21)
 Muse Watson (born 1948), actor, Prison Break, NCIS Reggie Wayne (born 1978), wide receiver for the Indianapolis Colts
 Carl Weathers (born 1948), NFL player; actor, Apollo Creed in the Rocky films
 Blayne Weaver (born 1976), actor
 Corey Webster (born 1982), cornerback for the New York Giants
 Gus Weill (1933–2018), political consultant and author
 Carl Weiss (1906–1935), physician; purported assassin of Huey Pierce Long Jr.
 Fred Weller (born 1966), actor, In Plain Sight, Missing Persons''
 Rebecca Wells (born 20th century), actress; playwright; author
 Vernon Wells (born 1978), outfielder for the New York Yankees
 Charcandrick West (born 1991), running back for the Kansas City Chiefs
 Shane West (born 1978), actor
 Lloyd F. Wheat (1923–2004), state senator from Natchitoches and Red River parishes (1948–52)
 Bodi White (born 1956), politician
 Edward Douglass White (1845–1921), Chief Justice of the United States
 John C. White (born 1975), Louisiana state superintendent of education (since 2012)
 Malinda Brumfield White (born 1967), state representative from Bogalusa, effective 2016
 Tony Joe White (1943–2018), singer-songwriter; musician
 Wally Whitehurst (born 1964), former MLB pitcher
 Lynn Whitfield (born 1953), actress
 Lenar Whitney (born 1959), politician
 Jonathan Wilhite (born 1984), cornerback for the Denver Broncos
 Robert L. Wilkie (born 1962), Assistant Secretary of Defense
 Aeneas Williams (born 1968), Hall of Fame defensive back in the NFL
 A. L. Williams (born 1934), retired football coach
 Brian "Baby" Williams (born 1969), record executive; record producer; entrepreneur; musician
 Chris Williams (born 1985), offensive guard for the Chicago Bears
 Doug Williams (born 1955), NFL quarterback, led Washington Redskins to Super Bowl XXII championship
 Duke Williams (born 1990), safety for the Buffalo Bills
 Gerald Williams (born 1966), former Major League Baseball outfielder
 Hank Williams Jr. (born 1949), singer
 Kyle Williams (born 1983), defensive tackle for the Buffalo Bills
 Lucinda Williams (born 1963), singer-songwriter; musician
 Mary Bushnell Williams (1826–1891), writer, poet, translator
 T. Harry Williams (1909–1979), historian
 Tramon Williams (born 1983), cornerback for the Green Bay Packers
 Norris C. Williamson (1874–1949), politician
 Edwin E. Willis (1904–1972), US Representative (1949–69)
 Tom Willmott (born 1960), state representative from Jefferson Parish (since 2008)
 Harry D. Wilson (1869–1948), Louisiana Commissioner of Agriculture and Forestry (1916–48)
 Justin E. Wilson (1914–2001), Cajun; raconteur; chef; humorist; politician
 Riley J. Wilson (1871–1946), U.S. representative
 Rush Wimberly (1873–1943), politician
 John D. Winters (1917–1998), historian
 Tommy Wiseau (born 1968), screenwriter; director; producer; executive producer; actor
 Reese Witherspoon (born 1976), Academy Award-winning actress
 A. Baldwin Wood (1879–1956), inventor; engineer
 Susan Ward (born 1976), actress; model
 Xavier Woods (born 1995), safety for the Dallas Cowboys
 J. Robert Wooley (born 1953), politician
 Orlando Woolridge (1959–2012), NBA power forward for several teams
 Zelma Wyche (1918–1999), politician; civil rights activist

Y
 Andrew Young (born 1932), politician and civil rights advocate
 Lester Young (1909–1959), musician
 Thaddeus Young (born 1988), small forward for the Philadelphia 76ers
 YoungBoy Never Broke Again (born 1999), rapper

Z

 Samuel Zemurray (1877–1961), businessman; philanthropist
 Buckwheat Zydeco (1947–2016), musician

See also

 Lists of Americans
 List of people from New Orleans, Louisiana

Notes